Gujarat State Petroleum Corporation Ltd (GSPCL) is a state government owned group of oil and gas exploration, production and distribution companies based in Gujarat, India. It is India's only state government-owned oil and gas company under the ownership of Department of Energy and Petrochemicals, Government of Gujarat. GSPC was incorporated in 1979 as a  petrochemical company.

History

Incorporated in 1979 as a petrochemical company, GSPC has a wide gamut of hydrocarbon activities. In 1992, GSPC widened the scope of its activities and rechristened itself as Gujarat State Petroleum Corporation in 1994.  With the Government of India's decision to privatize the hydrocarbon sector, GSPC acquired several discovered fields in the first and second rounds of bidding process initiated by the Government of India during 1994 and 1995. The company saw a great transformation from the year 2001, when DJ Pandian was appointed the managing director.
The public sector company's activities have become controversial, with the CAG indicting the company on many counts.

Operations
GSPC has made one of India's largest gas finds in the Krishna Godavari Basin. It has also built the country's first land-based drilling platform, Ratnakar, at Hazira. GSPC has also exploration activities in Egypt, Yemen, Indonesia, and Australia.

Subsidiaries
Gas
Gujarat State Petronet Limited (GSPL) is a natural gas transmission company. It has 2239 km long gas pipeline network (Gujarat Gas Grid) in Gujarat. Gujarat Gas (GGL) is natural gas distribution company which is India's largest city gas distribution company.  GSPL India Gasnet Limited (GIGL) and GSPL India Transco Limited (GITL) are join ventures promoted by GSPL along with Indian Oil Corporation Limited (IOCL), Bharat Petroleum Corporation Limited (BPCL) and Hindustan Petroleum Corporation Limited (HPCL) for the purpose of implementation of 2100 km pipeline passing through Mehsana - Bhatinda - Jammu - Srinagar and another 2042 km pipeline passing through Mallavarm - Bhopal - Bhilwara - Vijaipur respectively. Sabarmati Gas Limited (27.47% holding) was incorporated in 2006 for developing gas distribution network in 3 districts; Gandhinagar, Mehsana and Sabarkantha. GSPL (27.47%), GSPC (11.25%) and BPCL holds another 25.0% and institutional investors together hold rest of the company. GSPC LNG Limited (GLL) holds stake in the 5.0 million tonnes per year LNG terminal at Mundra which shall be commissioned in 2020.
Power generation
Gujarat State Energy Generation (GSEG) is a company for power generation in Gujarat which operate Haziara Gas Powerplant commissioned in 2002. GSPC Pipavav Power Company is a company for implementation of a power project at Pipavav in Saurashtra region of Gujarat. It is jointly held by Gujarat Power Corporation Ltd. (GPCL) of Gujarat Government.
IT
Guj Info Petro Ltd. (GIPL) provides IT and telecommunication services.
Education
The Gujarat Energy Research and Management Institute (GERMI) is an institution for energy education, training and research.

References

External links
GSPC Group website
GSPC GAS website
GIPL website
GERMI website

Oil and gas companies of India
Companies based in Ahmedabad
Companies listed on the Bombay Stock Exchange
State agencies of Gujarat
Energy in Gujarat
Indian companies established in 1979
1979 establishments in Gujarat
Companies listed on the National Stock Exchange of India